Drymoanthus, commonly known as midget orchids is a genus of epiphytic orchids in the family Orchidaceae. Plants in this genus are relatively small and unbranched with thick roots, narrow crowded leaves and small scented green flowers with a white labellum. There are four species, found in Australia, New Zealand and New Caledonia.

Description
Orchids in the genus Drymoanthus are small, unbranched, epiphytic herbs with thick roots, a thin stem, narrow, crowded, thin, leathery leaves and small, short-lived green flowers with a white labellum. The sepals and petals are similar to each other although the petals are slightly shorter. The labellum is white, boat-shaped, unlobed and stiffly attached to the column.

Taxonomy and naming
The genus Drymoanthus was first formally described in 1943 by William Henry Nicholls and the description was published in The Victorian Naturalist.

Four species are accepted by the World Checklist of Selected Plant Families:
Drymoanthus adversus (Hook.f.) Dockrill - New Zealand including Chatham Island
Drymoanthus flavus St.George & Molloy - New Zealand
Drymoanthus minimus (Schltr.) Garay - New Caledonia
Drymoanthus minutus Nicholls - Queensland

See also
 List of Orchidaceae genera

References

External links

Vandeae genera
Aeridinae
Orchids of Australia
Orchids of New Zealand
Orchids of New Caledonia
Epiphytes